The Colombia women's national baseball team is a national team of Colombia and is controlled by the Federación Colombiana de Béisbol. It represents the nation in women's international competition.

References 

Women's national